Dmitri Bruns (Dmitry Vladimirovich Bruns; ; 11 January 1929 – 21 March 2020) was a Latvia-born Soviet and Estonian architect and architecture theorist of Russian and German descent.

Bruns was born in Riga, Latvia. From 1959 he was the secretary of the Union of Architects of Estonian SSR. In 1960–1980 Bruns served as the chief architect of Tallinn.

Honours
Honoured Architect of Estonian SSR, 1973
The Badge of Honour of Tallinn, 2003

Publications
 "Tallinn täna ja homme", Tallinn: Eesti Riiklik Kirjastus 1962.
 "Homne Tallinn", Tallinn: Eesti Raamat 1973.
 "Tallinn valmistub olümpiaks", Tallinn: Kommunist 1979.
 "Tallinn. Linnaehituslik kujunemine", Tallinn: Valgus 1993. 
 "Tallinn. Linnaehitus Eesti Vabariigi aastail 1918 – 1940", Tallinn: Valgus 1998. 
 "Tallinna peaarhitekti mälestusi ja artikleid", Tallinn: Eesti Arhitektuurimuuseum 2007.

References

External links
Profile, at The Union of Estonian Architects

1929 births
Architects from Riga
Estonian people of Russian descent 
Estonian people of German descent 
Soviet architects
Architectural theoreticians
Architects from Tallinn
2020 deaths